Jasraj Joshi is an Indian playback singer. He has sung songs in Hindi, Marathi and in some other Indian languages, however he is most active in the Marathi film industry.

Career
He won Idea Sa Re Ga Ma Pa 2012, a televised singing contest. The 29-year-old defeated Ludhiana-based Shenaz Akhtar, Jaipur's Mohammad Aman, and Mumbai-based Vishwajeet Borwankar to win the title.

He has made performances in television, and various festivals in the light music and film music for last 9 years.

Film singing
He has sung songs in various films. Some of the films are: 
  (Marathi)
  (Hindi)
 Highway (Marathi)  
 Double Seat (Marathi)
 
 Online Binline (Marathi)
  (Marathi)
 Rustom (Hindi)
  (Marathi)
  (Gujarati; 'Father O Father!')

Non-film songs

References

Living people
Bollywood playback singers
Indian male singers
Marathi playback singers
Marathi-language singers
Year of birth missing (living people)